Anaesthesia, Trauma and Critical Care (ATACC) is an international trauma and anaesthesia organisation.

It is a non-profit charitable organisation whose objective is to deliver teaching in trauma management and patient care. The organisation's primary activities are teaching medical practitioners and other emergency services personnel in the management of trauma and pre-hospital care. In addition to its educational resources, the organisation also has an ATACC Medical Rescue Team (ATACC MRT), composed of practitioners from all specialities. It operates and is available for the purposes of trauma care management in the pre-hospital care environment throughout the United Kingdom on a voluntary basis.

There is an ATACC Disaster Response Team (ATACC DRT) available on standby for deployment to international disasters. The ATACC DRT, affiliated with the United Nations, has responded to international disasters and has been involved in disaster response training exercises.

ATACC courses 

The ATACC course is an international trauma course based in the United Kingdom. Accredited by two Royal Colleges and  emergency medical services, it teaches trauma care and prehospital anesthesia in relation to trauma patient management post Advanced Trauma Life Support (ATLS) certification.  Courses run at numerous times throughout the year for candidates drawn from all areas of medicine and trauma care.

The ATACC faculty consists of clinicians from each medical speciality and senior members of the emergency services. The course is for those working within trauma, surgery, anaesthesia, emergency medicine, critical care, radiology and pre-hospital medicine. It is also appropriate for any individual in a profession allied to medicine who may encounter trauma patients as part of their daily duties (whether they be Nurses, Operating Department Practitioners [ODPs], Physician Assistants or members of the emergency services) such as Paramedics, Emergency Medical Technicians (EMTs).

Other courses developed from the ATACC course include Rescue-trauma training (RTACC), scene safety and assessment (ISAC), critical care transport (BATT), human simulation critical incident training (CISTR).

ATACC started as a new approach to trauma education but has since developed into a spectrum of courses in addition to a highly skilled trauma and rescue team providing critical care at the roadside and other difficult environments. Every member of the ATACC team is committed to operating to the highest clinical standards, to keeping the ATACC courses up-to-date and to improving trauma care worldwide.

ATACC is known for its cult following on social media. They often perform surgical procedures similar to watching a show in the West End. There is little clinical benefit to watching these, with knowledge and skills not taught.

Other trauma courses 
Advanced Trauma Life Support (ATLS) was developed in the United States by the American College of Surgeons as a training programme for doctors in the management of acute trauma cases.

Definitive Surgical Trauma Skills course (DSTS) is a joint development between The Royal College of Surgeons of England, The Royal Centre for Defence Medicine and The Uniformed Services University of the Health Sciences, based in Maryland, United States. Originally designed for the military, the training structure was adapted to accommodate civilian surgical consultants and teaches vascular, cardiothoracic and general surgery techniques.

European Trauma Course (ETC). is an International trauma Course, covering both technical and non technical skill for multidisciplinary senior clinicians.

Prehospital Trauma Course (PHTLS).

See also 
 Advanced life support
 Anesthesia
 Advanced Trauma Life Support
 Definitive Surgical Trauma Skills
 Emergency medical services
 Intensive care medicine
 Trauma surgery

References

External links
 ATACC website

Anesthesiology organizations
Emergency medicine courses
Orthopedic organizations
Traumatology